Thekkekkara Superfast is a Malayalam language film. It was finished in 1998, but got released only in April 2004 along with Agninakshathram around Vishu.

Cast
 Mukesh as Ulahannan
 Dileep as Benny Pookkattuparambil
 Gayatri Shastri as Sophia
 Jagathy Sreekumar as Ahamedkutty
 Rajan P. Dev as Philippose Pookkattuparambil
 Prakash Raj as Johnykutty
 Bobby Kottarakkara as Thamban
 C. I. Paul as Paulachan
 KPAC Lalitha as Ammachi
 Rizabawa as Antappan
 Elias Babu as Thommikunju
 Harishree Ashokan as Bhairavan
 Kalamandalam Geethanandan

Soundtrack
This film includes seven songs written by lyricist Gireesh Puthenchery. The songs were composed by the music maestro Ouseppachan.

References

2004 films
2000s Malayalam-language films